"Solitaire" is a ballad written by Neil Sedaka and Phil Cody. Cody employs playing the card game of solitaire as a metaphor for a man "who lost his love through his indifference"—"while life goes on around him everywhere he's playing solitaire". The song is perhaps best known via its rendition by the Carpenters. Another version by Andy Williams reached number 4 in the UK Singles Chart in 1973.

Early versions
Sedaka originally was inspired by Frederic Chopin (his favorite classical composer) for the chorus and by Roberta Flack in the verses. When he presented the tune to Cody, he came up with the words based on his recent divorce; Cody had been playing solitaire frequently as a coping mechanism. Both Sedaka and Cody considered the composition to be a spiritual experience.

Neil Sedaka recorded "Solitaire" as the title cut for a 1972 album recorded at Strawberry Studios, Stockport, England: 10cc members Lol Creme, Kevin Godley and Graham Gouldman accompanied Sedaka while Eric Stewart, also of 10cc, engineered the session.

Appearing on 1972 album releases by both Tony Christie and Petula Clark, "Solitaire" had its first evident single release in February 1973 as recorded by the Searchers; however it was an autumn 1973 single by Andy Williams which would reach number 4 in the UK Singles Chart and afford Williams a number 1 hit in South Africa. The title cut from an album produced by Richard Perry, Williams' "Solitaire" also became a US Easy Listening hit at number 23. In 1974, Neil Sedaka's 1972 recording of "Solitaire" was included on his comeback album Sedaka's Back. Later in 1975, a live-in-concert version recorded by Sedaka at the Royal Festival Hall was issued as the B-side of "The Queen of 1964". This is the version of "Solitaire" that was released as part of Razor & Tie's 2007 Definitive Collection album.

Carpenters version
The Carpenters recorded "Solitaire" for the 1975 Horizon album; Richard Carpenter, familiar with the song via the versions by Neil Sedaka and Andy Williams, was "not crazy" about the song, but he felt it would showcase Karen Carpenter's vocal expertise. Despite assessing her vocal performance on "Solitaire" as "one of [her] greatest", Richard says that, "she never liked the song [and]...she never changed her opinion."

"Solitaire" was issued as the third single from Horizon; for the single version a guitar lead was added between the first verse and chorus. It hit number 17 on the Billboard Hot 100, their least successful single since "Bless the Beasts and Children" in 1971; it signaled a downturn in the group's popularity which, consolidated by the Top Ten shortfall of the lead single and title cut of the 1976 album A Kind of Hush, would prove irreversible. "Solitaire" did afford the Carpenters their twelfth of fifteen number 1 Easy Listening hits.

Chart performance

Weekly charts
Andy Williams

Year-end charts

The Carpenters

Personnel
Karen Carpenter – lead and backing vocals
Richard Carpenter – backing vocals, piano, Fender Rhodes electric piano, Hammond organ, orchestration,
Joe Osborn – bass
Tony Peluso – guitar
Jim Gordon – drums
Earle Dumler – oboe

Other notable cover versions

  
Clay Aiken (US #4, Canada #1, 2004)
Tony Christie
Jann Arden
Iveta Bartošová ("Solitér" Czech)
Shirley Bassey – from her album All by Myself (1982)
Beat Crusaders
Sheryl Crow
Vic Damone - from his album Now and Forever (1982).
Gallon Drunk
Johnny Goudie
Sissel Kyrkjebø
Johnny Mathis - included on his album Feelings (1975)
Joe McElderry
Nana Mouskouri
Jane Olivor
Patricia Paay (Netherlands number 24) 1983
Elvis Presley - included on his album From Elvis Presley Boulevard, Memphis, Tennessee (1976)
Brett Smiley
Westlife
Roger Whittaker
Mark Lanegan on his 2013 album Imitations
Josh Groban

Different version of the lyrics
There are significant differences between the lyrics in the Neil Sedaka, Andy Williams and Carpenters versions. Williams makes the lyrics personal, perhaps reflecting his then current separation from his wife, while the Carpenters take some of the Andy Williams changes but elsewhere keep Phil Cody's original lyrics.

See also
List of number-one adult contemporary singles of 1975 (U.S.)

References

1972 songs
1973 singles
1975 singles
Songs written by Neil Sedaka
Neil Sedaka songs
Sissel Kyrkjebø songs
The Searchers (band) songs
The Carpenters songs
Number-one singles in South Africa
Songs with lyrics by Phil Cody
A&M Records singles